Ejea de los Caballeros (commonly known simply as Ejea) is a town and municipality in the province of Zaragoza, part of the autonomous community of Aragon, Spain.

The town became part of the medieval Kingdom of Aragon in 1105 during the Spanish Reconquista, as Muslim rule in the region was receding.

Main sights
The town retains many medieval buildings, including:
It was renewed in 1649–1650.
It has a 16th-century portal with Romanesque sculptures.
The church of our Lady the Virgin of the Olive, renovated in 1765 over a pre-existing medieval building.

Villages
The municipality of Ejea de los Caballeros comprises nine different centres of population:
 Ejea de los Caballeros
 
 
 
 
 Pinsoro
 Rivas
 Santa Anastasia
 Valareña

Rivas and Farasdués are two historic villages that have been dependencies of Ejea for decades. The other six centres were built in the 1950s and 1960s in order to settle inhabitants and farmers to grow irrigation crops, following the construction of the Yesa Reservoir and Bardenas irrigation channel that brought water to these villages, among others (Sádaba, Tauste, and others).

Culture
The main local festival honours the Virgin of the Olive, the local saint. In June, there is also a medieval celebration for the patron saint, Saint John the Baptist.

Another local festival commemorates The Vote Day (January 14), an event during the Black Plague in which the townsfolk voted for the bringing of the Virgin of the Olive across the town to worship her. The plague is purported to have ended in the town that day.

Notable people
 Alberto Zapater – footballer
 Alberto Soro – footballer who plays for Granada CF
 Artistas del Gremio – brass band

Twin towns
 Marmande, France
  Portogruaro, Italy

References

Municipalities in the Province of Zaragoza